Miles Joseph (born May 2, 1974) is an American soccer coach and former player who earned three caps with the United States national soccer team. He spent six seasons in Major League Soccer and the part of one season in Major Indoor Soccer League. He was also a member of the U.S. soccer team at the 1996 Summer Olympics. He currently serves as an assistant coach for the Portland Timbers.

Youth and college
While born in Massachusetts, Miles grew up in Clifton Park, New York and graduated from Shenendehowa High School in 1992. During his high school career, he won three NY state championships and a national championship.  He entered Clemson University in the fall of 1992.

Professional
The MetroStars selected Miles in the second round (12th overall) in the 1996 MLS College Draft.  He was with the MetroStars until they traded him to the Columbus Crew on May 3, 2000 for a second round 2001 draft pick.  Joseph finished the 2000 season with Columbus before being traded to the Dallas Burn for the 2001 season.  At the end of the season, the Burn released him.  On February 13, 2003, the Dallas Sidekicks signed Miles as a free agent.  He played only seven games with the Sidekicks in the 2002–03 season before leaving the team to become an assistant coach with the Siena College women’s soccer team on August 5, 2003.

Miles served four years as an assistant coach for Major League Soccer's Real Salt Lake. Jason Kreis, the New York City FC head coach who knew Joseph from their times working together at Real Salt Lake, named Miles Joseph as the first assistant coach of New York City FC in 2014. New York City FC debuted as a club in the 2015 Major League Soccer season.

On November 2, 2015 New York City FC, disappointed with not making the 2015 MLS Cup Playoffs, announced they had parted ways with Head Coach Jason Kreis as well as Joseph and assistant C. J. Brown after just one year of management and would be looking for a new head coach for the following season.

National teams
Joseph was selected for the roster of the U.S. team at the 1993 U-20 World Cup held in Australia.   He scored a goal in the 6–0 victory over Turkey.  The U.S. went 1–1–1 in group play, qualifying for the second round where it fell to Brazil.  In 1996, U.S. coach Bruce Arena named Joseph to the U.S. soccer team at the 1996 Summer Olympics.  Once again, the team went 1–1–1, but this time failed to make the second round.  Joseph earned his first cap with the U.S. national soccer team when he came on for Cobi Jones in the 89th minute of a 3–1 win over El Salvador on August 30, 1996.  He was again a late game substitute on December 21, 1996 in a 2–2 tie with Guatemala.  He started his last national team game, a 2–1 loss to China, before coming off at halftime for Cobi Jones.

Miles has now joined the technical coaching staff for Real Salt Lake (MLS). Prior to joining RSL, he was the technical and coaching director for Players Soccer Academy and the executive director for the New York Elite soccer program in the Clifton Park, New York area.

References

External links
 MetroStars profile
 Dallas Sidekicks profile
 Siena University coaching profile
 NY Elite FC
 Real Salt Lake

1974 births
American soccer coaches
American soccer players
Clemson Tigers men's soccer players
Columbus Crew players
FC Dallas players
Dallas Sidekicks (2001–2008 MISL) players
Living people
New York Red Bulls players
Major League Soccer players
United States men's international soccer players
Olympic soccer players of the United States
Footballers at the 1996 Summer Olympics
Siena Saints men's soccer coaches
Soccer players from New York (state)
United States men's under-20 international soccer players
United States men's under-23 international soccer players
New York Red Bulls draft picks
New York City FC non-playing staff
Real Salt Lake non-playing staff
Orlando City SC non-playing staff
Association football utility players
Association football defenders
Association football midfielders
Association football forwards